The Drake Fieldhouse is an athletic facility of Drake University. It was built in 1926 as a companion to Drake's football stadium. It is the location for the athletic department offices, an indoor track, a tartan court area and equipment and locker rooms. It was formerly the home for Drake Bulldogs men's basketball until they moved to Veterans Memorial Auditorium. The first basketball game was played on January 4, 1927. The last regularly scheduled game was played during the 1961–62 school year. The last men's basketball game to be played there was on February 28, 1987, when Veterans Memorial Auditorium was not available so they had to play Southern Illinois in the conference tournament at the Fieldhouse.

Drake Fieldhouse has hosted many high school events, including the boys state basketball tournament around the time of World War II and the girl's indoor track tournament as recently as the mid 1990s.

External links
http://www.bulldogsoccercamps.com/index.cfm?page=4

Sports in Des Moines, Iowa
Sports venues in Greater Des Moines
Indoor arenas in Iowa
Drake University
Defunct college basketball venues in the United States
Buildings and structures in Des Moines, Iowa
Basketball venues in Iowa
1926 establishments in Iowa
Sports venues completed in 1926
Defunct sports venues in Iowa
Indoor track and field venues in the United States